Irenopolis or Eirenopolis ("city of peace") may refer to several places:

 Beroea (Thrace), in Thrace
 Irenopolis (Cilicia), also a Roman Catholic titular bishopric
 Irenopolis (Isauria), also a Roman Catholic titular bishopric
 Stara Zagora, in the Balkans
 A nickname for Middlesbrough, North Yorkshire, England

See also
 Eirinoupoli, Imathia, Central Macedonia, Greece
 Ironopolia, a genus of moths